Calliostoma akoya is a species of sea snail, a marine gastropod mollusk in the family Calliostomatidae.

Some authors consider it the sole member of the non-accepted subgenus Akoya.

Description
The size of the shell varies between 15 mm and 33 mm.

Distribution
This marine species occurs off Japan and in the China Sea.

References

External links
 

akoya
Gastropods described in 1942